Sant'Eufemia d'Aspromonte is a comune (municipality) in the Province of Reggio Calabria in the Italian region Calabria, located about  southwest of Catanzaro and about  northeast of Reggio Calabria.

Overview
Sant'Eufemia d'Aspromonte borders the following municipalities: Bagnara Calabra, Melicuccà, San Procopio, Scilla, Sinopoli.

Robert Guiscard established a monastery here in the 11th century. Its first abbot was Robert de Grantmesnil, the exiled abbot of Saint-Evroul-sur-Ouche, who brought with him 11 monks and began a musical tradition at Sant'Eufemia to rival the fame of that of Saint-Evroul.

Demographic evolution

References

External links

Cities and towns in Calabria